Hatherleigh is a locality in the Australian state of South Australia located in the state's Limestone Coast region about  south-east  of the state capital of Adelaide and about  north-west of the municipal seat in Millicent.

The 2016 Australian census which was conducted in August 2016 reports that Hatherleigh had a population of 131 people.

Hatherleigh is located within the federal Division of Barker and the state Electoral district of Mackillop, and  within the local government area of the Wattle Range Council.

References

Towns in South Australia
Limestone Coast